Kuwaiti (in Kuwaiti accent) is a Gulf Arabic dialect spoken in Kuwait. Kuwaiti Arabic shares many phonetic features unique to Gulf dialects spoken in the Arabian Peninsula. Due to Kuwait's soap opera industry, knowledge of Kuwaiti Arabic has spread throughout the Arabic-speaking world and become recognizable even to people in countries such as Tunisia and Jordan.

History and development 
Kuwaiti Arabic speakers exhibit features not found in Modern Standard Arabic (MSA), due in part to natural linguistic change over time, influence from nearby dialects in Iraq and Saudi Arabia, as well as influence from English, Italian, Persian, Turkish, as well as Hindi-Urdu and Swahili. Three groups make up the Kuwaiti population: the descendants of people from the Arabian Peninsula, Iraq, and Iran.

Kuwaiti Arabic is rapidly changing due to many factors, in particular contact with speakers of other languages and other Arabic varieties.

Phonology 
Kuwaiti Arabic has three short vowels  and five long vowels . Short  and  appear in some words, typically as allophones (such as word-final , which raises to ), though their phonemicity is marginal and many of the words they appear in are loans from other languages.

Consonants in parentheses are marginal, found exclusively in formal, educated speech or from loanwords. Similarly, the glottal stop  is rare, occurring in borrowings from Modern Standard Arabic.

Varieties 
Kuwaiti Arabic is divided into two varieties: Urban and Bedouin; the latter is considered to be more linguistically conservative, while the former, associated largely with sedentary urban speakers, has novel features not shared by surrounding dialects and is considered to be more prestigious. The urban dialect originates from the spoken dialect of Arabian Peninsular Arabic speakers who migrated to the area in the 18th century, being strongly influenced by contact with and immigration from the outside world.

The Urban speech is divided into four sub-dialects, while the Bedouin dialect is divided into two. The four sedentary dialects are:
 Sharq: Mainly used by Ajam, who settled the district. It is a result of a mixture of the various different dialects spoken in Kuwait in the past. (See also Sharg)
 Jibla (See also Jibla)
 Failicha (See also Failaka Island)
 Fintaas (See also Fintaas, Kuwait)
While the two Bedouin varieties are:
 Jahra (See also Jahra, Kuwait)
 Dimna: Used mainly by the descendants of Al-Azmy tribe. ad-Dimna is the old name of Salmiya City, Kuwait

Historians and researchers usually demonstrate differences between the dialects using , the Kuwaiti word for "sugar", which has three different pronunciations depending on the speaker's dialect. It is pronounced in Sharg dialect, Shakar in Fintaas dialect, and Shakir in Jibla dialect.

Status 
Dashti identifies four varieties of Arabic in Kuwait. Classical Arabic (CA), the language of the Quran, the liturgical language of Islam, the religion of the vast majority of Kuwaitis, and old Arabic literature, Modern Standard Arabic (MSA), which is the medium of formal communication and school education. This variety is considered the second language of Kuwaitis as they are only introduced to when they start school. Kuwaiti Arabic (KA), the language of everyday's life and the symbol of the Kuwaiti identity. It is a symbol of prestige in the Kuwaiti society. The last variety is Educated Standard Arabic (ESA), in which the speaker mixes between MSA and KA. This language is used in Radio, TV, and academics' informal discussions. Kuwait is diglossic, like the rest of the Arab world, with the Arabic language being seen as the high variety, while Kuwaiti is seen more like a patois or a low-variety colloquial dialect of Arabic.

Kuwaiti is the "normal" way of speaking in everyday's life and is acquired naturally at home and not taught at schools (as it is considered a mere dialect of the Arabic language by the public).

After conducting several interviews with speakers of Kuwaiti, Akbar states that for many, speaking Kuwaiti is the most important criterion of being considered Kuwaiti.

Features and characteristics 
Kuwaiti Arabic is a variant of Gulf Arabic, sharing similarities with the dialects of neighboring coastal areas in Eastern Arabia. Due to immigration during its early history as well as trade, Kuwaiti was influenced by many languages such as Persian, English, Italian, Urdu, Turkish, and others.

A characteristic in Kuwait is the use of words and phrases by women exclusively, for example "يَا حَافِظ", roughly translated to "Oh Saver [God]", is rarely or never used by men. It also differs from other Arabic variants in the way phonological assimilation occurs to a multitude of words, but not to all of them. The only case of full assimilation is /dˤ/ changing to /ðˤ/ in all words.

Differences between Standard Arabic and Kuwaiti 

Each colloquial variety of Arabic has evolved and developed over time from earlier Arabic dialects. In addition to the phonological differences mentioned above, some of the grammatical differences between the Standard Arabic (MSA) and Kuwaiti Arabic are:
 Kuwaiti uses SVO more often (unless the subject is omitted because of the verb's conjugation), while Modern Standard Arabic uses VSO most of the time. There may be a relationship between definiteness and pragmatic factors that control the choice of VSO vs. SVO in Kuwaiti and other Arabic varieties.
 Copulas are used in Kuwaiti, unlike Arabic. Below is a table of copulas used in Kuwaitis:
Note: Copulas are used before verbs only, not adjectives. For example: I am drinking, not I am drunk. Many linguists define copulas as expressing identity and "is-a" relations. Since the following "copulas" are only use before verbs, they may be classified as aspectual particles.

The past tenses are formed by adding كَانْ  before each copula.
 Almost all of Arabic declensions are omitted in Kuwaiti.
 Dual grammatical person is not used, though dual nouns are still used.
 Feminine forms in plural second and third person are not used.
 The definite article, al-, became el- (-) in Kuwaiti.

Lexicon 
Kuwaiti has borrowed many words from other languages due to immigration and trade. Below are few examples with the corresponding Arabic words. As noticed, many words come from Turkish. This is due to the historical influence of Ottomans that ruled over neighboring regions.

Note: A green box indicates that the MSA word is used in Kuwaiti (most of the times interchangeably), while a red box means it is not.

Old-fashioned or obsolete words 
some words were replaced by native Arabic words over time. A few examples of such words include:
 رنق (ring), A Persian word that means colour.
 خاتون (ḵātūn) "female nurse", from Turkish word meaning "noble woman", now replaced with سستر (sister), from English.
 بنسل (binsil), from English Pencil. 
 كنديشن (candēshin), from English Conditioner (as in Air conditioner).
 فنگر (fingar), from English "finger".
 كرفاية (karfāya), from Hindi.
Dr. Ya'goob al-Ghaneem points at the increasing numbers of Arab expatriate and exposure to media in different Arabics as the reasons behind this change. Fatima Mahasin hypothesises that the words being replaced are not of English, French or Italian origins, and tend originate from "less-prestigious" languages.

See also
 Arabic language
 Gulf Arabic

References

Bibliography

Further reading

Arabic languages
Arabs in Kuwait
Mashriqi Arabic
Gulf Arabic
Languages of Kuwait